The 33rd Street station is a terminal station on the PATH system. Located at the intersection of 32nd Street and Sixth Avenue (Avenue of the Americas) in the Herald Square neighborhood of Midtown Manhattan, New York City, it is served by the Hoboken–33rd Street and Journal Square–33rd Street lines on weekdays, and by the Journal Square–33rd Street (via Hoboken) line on late nights, weekends and holidays. 33rd Street serves as the northern terminus of all three lines.

History

Opening 

The 33rd Street station is part of the Uptown Hudson Tubes, built by the Hudson & Manhattan Railroad (H&M), the PATH's predecessor. The first section of the tubes opened in February 1908. The 33rd Street station opened on November 10, 1910, as part of the northern extension of the line. The original plans for the Uptown Hudson Tubes called for a terminal at 33rd Street under the Gimbels department store, now Manhattan Mall. During construction, the plan was changed so the 33rd Street station was directly under Sixth Avenue, providing for a future northward extension. The Gimbels store at the site opened in 1910, but the underlying plot was owned by an H&M subsidiary until 1919, when it was sold to Gimbels.

An extension of the tunnel to Grand Central Terminal and the Grand Central subway station was proposed in 1910. A franchise to extend the Uptown Hudson Tubes to Grand Central was awarded in June 1909. Work never started due to various delays. By 1920, the H&M had submitted seventeen applications in which they sought to delay construction of the extension to Grand Central; in all seventeen instances, the H&M claimed that it was not an appropriate time to construct the tube. On the H&M's seventeenth application, the Rapid Transit Commissioners declined the request for a delay, effectively ending the H&M's right to build an extension to Grand Central.

Relocation
In 1924, the city-operated Independent Subway System (IND) submitted its list of proposed subway routes to the New York City Board of Transportation. One of the proposed routes, the Sixth Avenue Line, ran parallel to the Uptown Hudson Tubes from Ninth to 33rd streets. Negotiations between the city, IND, and H&M continued until 1929. The IND and H&M finally came to an agreement in 1930. The city had decided to build the IND Sixth Avenue Line's local tracks around the pre-existing H&M tubes, and add express tracks for the IND underneath the H&M tubes at a later date.

The 33rd Street terminal closed on December 26, 1937, and service on the H&M was cut back to 28th Street to allow for construction on the subway to take place. A temporary 29th Street entrance was installed at the 28th Street station. The 33rd Street terminal was moved south to 32nd Street and reopened on September 24, 1939. The city paid $800,000 to build the new 33rd Street station and reimbursed H&M another $300,000 for the loss of revenue. As part of this upgrade, the 28th Street station was closed and demolished. As a partial compensation for the loss of the station, an entrance to the new terminal was opened at 30th Street.  The IND line opened in December 1940.

Subsequent years 
In 1962, the Port Authority of New York and New Jersey formally took over the H&M, rebranding the system as Port Authority Trans-Hudson (PATH). A "Gimbels passageway" was formerly used by pedestrians to connect to Penn Station a block to the west under 33rd Street. After years of safety and sanitation concerns, an epidemic of sexual assaults led to its closure in the 1980s.

A train-car wash formerly operated at track 1 of the 33rd Street terminal. It was replaced by a wash that opened in mid-September 1993 in Jersey City. It was computer-operated, and designed to reclean and recycle the water used. More space for the operation was provided at Jersey City, allowing the detergent used on the cars to have more time to take effect. At 33rd Street, brushes began scrubbing the cars very soon after the detergent went on. Its completion allowed the PANYNJ to deactivate the car wash at 33rd Street, providing more flexibility in terminal operations there.

Station layout

The present station has three tracks in a Spanish solution with two island platforms and two side platforms, located two stories below ground level. There is a small mezzanine with turnstiles, located above the platforms, at the south end of the station. The tracks end at bumper blocks at the north end of the station, where ramps from each platform lead up to the northern turnstile area, located about one and a half stories below ground level.

Exits

At the south end of the 33rd Street station are two staircases, one to either side of Sixth Avenue between 30th and 31st Streets. The northern end contains exits to the northwest and northeast corners of Sixth Avenue and 32nd Street, and an elevator on the west side of Sixth Avenue between 32nd and 33rd Streets. From the northern end of the station, there are also passageways to the connected New York City Subway station and its own exits.

Nearby attractions
 Empire State Building
 Herald Square
 Koreatown
 Macy's
 Madison Square Garden
 Penn Station
 Manhattan Mall

References

External links

PATH - 33rd Street Station
 32nd Street entrance from Google Maps Street View
 30th Street entrance from Google Maps Street View
 Platform from Google Maps Street View

PATH stations in Manhattan
Sixth Avenue
Railway stations in the United States opened in 1910
Railway stations located underground in New York (state)